The Andrew Dickhaut Cottages Historic District encompasses a collection of historic worker cottages in the Smith Hill neighborhood of Providence, Rhode Island, along with the home of their builder, Andrew Dickhaut.  The cottages are located at 114—141 Bath Street (odd numbers), 6-18 Duke Street (even numbers), and the Dickhaut house is located at 377 Orms Street.  The cottages are virtually identical -story wood-frame structures, set on small lots close to the sidewalk.  Those on Bath Street were built in 1882, while those on Duke Street were built in 1892.  This collection represents a remarkably well-preserved collection of worker housing, a building form which is often poorly documented.

The district was added to the National Register of Historic Places in 1984.

See also
National Register of Historic Places listings in Providence, Rhode Island

References

Historic districts in Providence County, Rhode Island
Geography of Providence, Rhode Island
Historic districts on the National Register of Historic Places in Rhode Island
National Register of Historic Places in Providence, Rhode Island